Cynosphenodon ("Dog Sphenodontian") is an extinct genus of the family Sphenodontidae from the Middle Jurassic La Boca Formation of Tamaulipas, Mexico.  Growth patterns in the teeth of Cynosphenodon suggest its close relationship with the modern tuatara.

References

Jurassic lepidosaurs
Sphenodontia
Fossils of Mexico
Prehistoric reptile genera